Sasami Ashworth (born June 23, 1990), known mononymously as Sasami, is an American musician who records music in a variety of styles, from singer-songwriter ballads to heavy metal and industrial. She began her career as a member of Cherry Glazerr but went solo in 2018. Her most recent album, Squeeze, was released in 2022.

Career

Early life 
Sasami Ashworth comes from a Zainichi family. After she graduated from the Eastman School of Music in 2012, she scored and made orchestral arrangements for films, commercials and studio albums, and worked as a music teacher in Los Angeles, where she is currently based. In 2015, she joined the American rock band Cherry Glazerr with whom she played synths and toured for two and a half years before announcing her departure in January 2018 to pursue her solo musical career.

Solo career 
In April 2018, Sasami shared her first solo track "Callous" on SoundCloud, which Pitchfork awarded with their "Best New Track" label. Later that year Domino Recording Company announced that Sasami had signed to their label, and released the songs "Callous" and "Not the Time". The Fader called Sasami "rock's next big thing." Sasami stated, "I wrote both of these songs on tour on a guitar on my iPad with GarageBand plugins and Moog 15 app sounds and then re-recorded them in the studio onto tape with really great tones. So it's kind of like emotionally scribbling a letter on a tear and snot-stained napkin and then re-writing it on fancy papyrus paper to make it look like you have your shit together." The songs were released on a 7" vinyl in October 2018. 

Throughout 2018, Sasami toured with various musicians, including Baths, No Joy, King Tuff, Mitski, Soccer Mommy, Snail Mail and Menace Beach. In early 2019, Sasami announced her eponymous debut studio album, Sasami, and released two more singles. The album was released in March of that year. In February 2022 Sasami released her second album, Squeeze, on Domino. The album received many positive reviews and was named as one of the best albums of the year by Rolling Stone, among others.

Discography

Studio albums

Singles

Credits

References

External links
 
 

21st-century American women singers
American women guitarists
American women singer-songwriters
American indie rock musicians
American multi-instrumentalists
Feminist musicians
Women bass guitarists
Living people
Musicians from Los Angeles
Guitarists from California
21st-century American singers
1990 births
Singer-songwriters from California
American musicians of Korean descent